This is a timeline of women rabbis in the United States.

 

 1890s: Ray Frank, a young Jewish woman living on the American frontier, began delivering sermons in her small Jewish community in the American West. Frank was regarded at the time as the "first woman rabbi".
 1972: Sally Priesand became America's first female rabbi ordained by a rabbinical seminary, and the second formally ordained female rabbi in Jewish history, after Regina Jonas.
 1974: Sandy Eisenberg Sasso became the first female rabbi in Reconstructionist Judaism.
 1975: The Women's Rabbinic Network, an American national organization for female Reform rabbis, was founded in 1975 by female rabbinic students.
 1976: Michal Mendelsohn became the first presiding female rabbi in a North American congregation when she was hired by Temple Beth El Shalom in San Jose, California.
1976: Rabbi Ilene Schneider, Ed.D., graduated from the Reconstructionist Rabbinical College in Philadelphia and was one of the first six female rabbis ordained in the United States.
 1977: Sandy Eisenberg Sasso and her husband Dennis Sasso became the first couple to serve jointly as rabbis when they were hired by Beth-El Zedeck in Indianapolis.
 1979: Linda Joy Holtzman became the first woman to serve as a rabbi for a Conservative congregation when she was hired by Beth Israel Congregation of Chester County, which was then located in Coatesville, Pennsylvania. She had graduated in 1979 from the Reconstructionist Rabbinical College in Philadelphia, yet was hired by Beth Israel despite their being a Conservative congregation.
 1981: Helene Ferris became the first second-career female rabbi.
 1981: Lynn Gottlieb became the first female rabbi in Jewish Renewal.
 1981: Bonnie Koppell became the first female rabbi to serve in the U.S. military. She joined the army reserves in 1978 while a rabbinical student at the Reconstructionist Rabbinical College in Philadelphia, Pennsylvania, and was ordained in 1981.

 1984: From 1984 to 1990 Barbara Borts, born in America, was a rabbi at Radlett Reform Synagogue, making her the first woman rabbi to have a pulpit of her own in a UK Reform Judaism synagogue.
 1985: Amy Eilberg became the first female rabbi in Conservative Judaism.
 1986: Amy Perlin became the first female rabbi in America to start her own congregation, Temple B'nai Shalom in Fairfax Station, which she was the founding rabbi of in 1986.
 1986: Leslie Alexander became the first female rabbi of a major Conservative Jewish synagogue in the United States in 1986 at Adat Ari El synagogue in North Hollywood.
 1986: Julie Schwartz became the first woman to serve as an active-duty Jewish chaplain in the U.S. Navy.
 1987: Joy Levitt became the first female president of the Reconstructionist Rabbinical Association.
 1988: Stacy Offner became the first openly lesbian rabbi hired by a mainstream Jewish congregation (Shir Tikvah in Minneapolis).
 1992: Karen Soria became the first female rabbi to serve in the U.S. Marines, which she did from 1992 until 1996.
 1993: Rebecca Dubowe became the first Deaf woman to be ordained as a rabbi in the United States.

 1993: Ariel Stone became the first American rabbi to lead a congregation in the former Soviet Union, and the first progressive rabbi to serve the Jewish community in Ukraine
 1993: Chana Timoner became the first female rabbi to hold an active duty assignment as a chaplain in the U.S. Army.
 1994: Laura Geller became the first woman to lead a major metropolitan congregation, specifically Temple Emanuel in Beverly Hills.
 1994: Rabbi Shohama Wiener became the first woman to head a Jewish seminary, the Academy for Jewish Religion. 
 1995: Dianne Cohler-Esses became the first Syrian woman to become a rabbi, and the first Syrian non-Orthodox rabbi, when she was ordained by the Jewish Theological Seminary in 1995.
 1996: Cynthia Culpeper became the first pulpit rabbi to announce being diagnosed with AIDS, which she did when she was rabbi of Agudath Israel in Montgomery, Alabama.
 1999: Tamara Kolton became the very first rabbi of either sex in Humanistic Judaism.
 2000: Helga Newmark, born in Germany, became the first female Holocaust survivor ordained as a rabbi. She was ordained in America.<ref name=autogenerated2>{{cite web|url=http://huc.edu/newspubs/pressroom/article.php?pressroomid=2004 |title= StackPath HUC-JIR: Press Room - In Memoriam: Rabbi Helga Newmark, zl |publisher=Huc.edu |date=March 8, 2012 |accessdate=September 8, 2013}}</ref>

 2001: Angela Warnick Buchdahl, born in Korea, became the first Asian-American rabbi. She was ordained in America.
 2002: Jacqueline Mates-Muchin was ordained by Hebrew Union College-Jewish Institute of Religion in New York, and thus became the first Chinese-American rabbi.
 2002: Pamela Frydman became the first female president of OHALAH (Association of Rabbis for Jewish Renewal.)
 2003: Janet Marder was named the first female president of the Reform Movement's Central Conference of American Rabbis (CCAR) on March 26, 2003, making her the first woman to lead a major rabbinical organization and the first woman to lead any major Jewish co-ed religious organization in the United States.
 2003: Sarah Schechter became the first female rabbi to serve as a chaplain in the U.S. Air Force.
 2006: Chaya Gusfield and Lori Klein became the first openly lesbian rabbis ordained by the Jewish Renewal movement.
 2008: Julie Schonfeld was named the new executive vice president of the Conservative movement's Rabbinical Assembly, becoming the first female rabbi to serve in the chief executive position of an American rabbinical association. 
 2009: In June 2009, Avi Weiss ordained Sara Hurwitz with the title "maharat" (an acronym of manhiga hilkhatit rukhanit Toranit'') rather than "Rabbi". In February 2010, Weiss announced that he was changing Maharat to a more familiar-sounding title "Rabba". Hurwitz continues to use the title Rabba and is considered by some to be the first female Orthodox rabbi.

 2009: Alysa Stanton, born in Cleveland and ordained by a Reform Jewish seminary in Cincinnati, became the first African-American female rabbi. Later in 2009 she began work as a rabbi at Congregation Bayt Shalom, a small majority-white synagogue in Greenville, North Carolina, making her the first African-American rabbi to lead a majority-white congregation.
 2011: Rachel Isaacs became the first openly lesbian rabbi ordained by the Conservative movement's Jewish Theological Seminary ("JTS"), which occurred in May 2011.
 2012: Ilana Mills was ordained, thus making her, Jordana Chernow-Reader, and Mari Chernow the first three female siblings in America to become rabbis.
 2012: Emily Aviva Kapor, who had been ordained privately by a "Conservadox" rabbi in 2005, began living as a woman in 2012, thus becoming the first openly transgender female rabbi.
 2014: Rabbi Deborah Waxman was inaugurated as the president of the Reconstructionist Rabbinical College and Jewish Reconstructionist Communities on October 26, 2014. As the president of the Reconstructionist Rabbinical College, she is the first lesbian to lead a Jewish congregational union, and the first lesbian to lead a Jewish seminary; the Reconstructionist Rabbinical College is both a congregational union and a seminary.
 2015: Mira Rivera became the first Filipino-American woman to be ordained as a rabbi.
 2015: Lila Kagedan, born in Canada, became the first graduate of Yeshivat Maharat to use the title "Rabbi".
 2015: Abby Stein came out as transgender and thus became the first woman (and the first openly transgender woman) to have been ordained by an ultra-Orthodox  institution, having received her rabbinical degree in 2011 from Yeshiva Viznitz in South Fallsburg, N.Y. While this was before she was openly transgender, and she was not working as a rabbi when she came out, by 2020 she had re-embraced her title as rabbi, and was working in many capacities as a rabbi.
 2016: After four years of deliberation, Hebrew Union College-Jewish Institute of Religion decided to give women a choice of wording on their ordination certificates beginning in 2016, including the option to have the same wording as men. Previously, male candidates' ordination certificates identified them by the Reform movement's traditional "morenu harav," or "our teacher the rabbi," while female candidates' certificates only used the term "rav u’morah," or "rabbi and teacher."

See also 
 Rabbi#Women rabbis
 Timeline of women rabbis
 Women in Judaism

References

 United States
History of women in the United States
Women rabbis
rabbis usa
Judaism in the United States
History of religion in the United States
History of Judaism